George Maynard (18 May 1909 – 1976) was a British film producer. During the 1950s and 1960s he produced a number of independent films. Maynard had earlier worked as a production manager at several British studios.

Selected filmography
 The Courtneys of Curzon Street (1947)
 Radio Cab Murder (1954)
 Where There's a Will (1955)
 Soho Incident (aka Spin a Dark Web) (1956) 
Rogue's Yarn (1957)
 The Strange World of Planet X (1958)
 Ferry to Hong Kong (1959)
 A Prize of Arms (1962)
 Zeta One (1969)

Bibliography
 Chibnall, Steve & McFarlane, Brian. The British 'B' Film. Palgrave MacMillan, 2011.
 Hunter, I.Q. British Science Fiction Cinema. Routledge, 2002.

External links

1909 births
1976 deaths
Film producers from London